Green Spring is an unincorporated community in northern Frederick County, Virginia, United States of America. Green Spring lies on the southern flank of North Mountain along Green Spring Run, a tributary stream of Back Creek. The community is located on Green Spring Road (VA 671) at its junction with Cedar Grove Road (VA 654).

Historic sites 
Old Stone Church (1820), listed on the National Register of Historic Places

References

Unincorporated communities in Frederick County, Virginia
Unincorporated communities in Virginia